The Lovells Island Range Lights were range lights on Lovells Island in Boston Harbor, Massachusetts. They were built in 1903 to help vessels coming into what is now called "South Channel". As the North Channel was dredged deeper, the South Channel was less used and they were removed in 1939 to make room for the expansion of Fort Standish. The oil shed from the lights remains today.

References

Lighthouses completed in 1903
Boston Harbor
Lighthouses in Boston